Cartwright is an unincorporated urban community in the Cartwright – Roblin Municipality within the Canadian province of Manitoba that held village status prior to January 1, 2015. It was originally incorporated as a village on December 31, 1947.

History 

Situated along the Badger Creek, the original location of Cartwright (also known as the Badger, or Old Cartwright) was established in 1879 by pioneers following the Boundary Commission Trail.  Old Cartwright began on two townsites, one owned by P.C. McKibbin, the other by J.C. Waugh. The two men admired Sir Richard Cartwright and agreed to name their communities "Cartwright."

Waugh's land, being directly on the Boundary Commission Trail, became the area truly considered Cartwright.

In 1885, the location of Cartwright was moved 3.2 kilometres south to its present location to coincide with the building of the Canadian Pacific Railway line through that area. Cartwright's original location was along the Badger Creek and the Boundary Commission Trail and was known as the Badger, about two miles north of where it is today.  Cartwright moved to its current location in 1885 with the building of the railway through this area. The community of Cartwright is located at the corner of Highway #5 and Highway #3 in the RM of Roblin, within the Province of Manitoba, in Canada. Ponderosa Days, Cartwright's annual summer celebration, is held on August long weekend.

Demographics 

Industry 

Primarily a farming community, Cartwright does include manufacturing industry, including trailer manufacturing, "Ready To Move" or "RTM" house construction, cabinet-makers and associated supply retailers.

Southern Manitoba Review 
The local newspaper, the Review, was started in 1899 by Robert J.C. Stead; in 1904 the paper was renamed The Southern Manitoba Review. In 1908 the paper was taken over by Stead's brothers-in-law, D.J. and Will Wallace and continues to operate in the Wallace family, today.

Places of interest 

The Clay Banks (buffalo jump), a site about 2,500 years old, used by Sonata and Besant First Nations as a hunting tool. Hunters would stampede American Bison over these cliffs, later carving up the animal carcasses below for use as food, tools, and clothing.
Heritage Park Museums, a collection of historic buildings including a shoe repair shop, post office, Manitoba Telephone System building, and a single-room school house.  Each building contains a collection of artifacts relating to the building's former use.
Blacksmith Museum, a fully restored and working blacksmith's shop. Opened upon request.
Badger Creek Crossing Cairn, marking the original site of Old Cartwright.
Cartwright Town & Country Golf Club, a 9-hole golf course.
Rock Lake Beach, approximately 18 km north of Cartwright, features lots for cabins, fishing, boating and other water recreation.

Notable people 
Robert J.C. Stead, writer

See also
 Hansboro–Cartwright Border Crossing

References

External links 

Cartwright – Roblin Municipality website

Designated places in Manitoba
Former villages in Manitoba
Pembina Valley Region
Populated places disestablished in 2015
2015 disestablishments in Manitoba